Kiem Ling Roy Ho Ten Soeng (born 16 June 1945) is a Dutch politician of the Christian Democratic Appeal (CDA). Born in Suriname and of Chinese descent, he was often considered the first immigrant mayor in the Netherlands, although Dzsingisz Gabor was mayor of Haaksbergen in 1983 till 1990. Roy is the first mayor of Chinese descent in the Netherlands and in Europe.

Ho Ten Soeng was originally a teacher and has worked in Suriname, Aruba and the Netherlands. First as a teacher and later as a history teacher in secondary schools in Zaanstad and Haarlem.

In 1990, Ho Ten Soeng became an alderman in Alkmaar and on 1 January 2000 he became mayor of Venhuizen. His congregation became involved in a merger process with the municipality of Drechterland. He is very active in the field of volunteering. In this context, he also founded the Chinese Consultative Body, he is chairman of the Network Chinese Volunteers and is requested regularly in churches of the Moravians (EBG) as active pastor. Currently he is a "VNG Ambassador Safety" for North Holland.

Roy was from 1 December 2005 acting mayor of Medemblik. He held that position until the merger with Noorder-Koggenland and Wognum on 1 January 2007.

In 2008, Ho Ten Soeng was involved with the scouting of immigrant and female mayor candidates for the Dutch Ministry of the Interior.

In early 2011 he was on the 12th place on the list of candidates of 50PLUS for the Senate. For the 2012 general election he stood in sixth place on the list of candidates.

See also
 European politicians of Chinese descent

References

External links 
  article about Ho Ten Soeng's talent
 article of RNW

1945 births
Living people
Dutch politicians of Chinese descent
Christian Democratic Appeal politicians
Dutch people of Chinese descent
Surinamese people of Chinese descent
Surinamese emigrants to the Netherlands
People from Paramaribo